The 14th Golden Bell Awards was held on 26 March 1978 at the Armed Forces Cultural Center in Taipei, Taiwan. The ceremony was hosted by Ting Mao-shih.

Winners

References

1978
1978 in Taiwan